Anton Aleksandrovich Utkine is a Russian writer and director of documentary film born on March 24, 1967, in Moscow.

Biography 
Anton Utkin was born on March 24, 1967 in Moscow where he has always lived. During his high school years, he also attended classes at the Gnessine School of Music. After his military service, he studied at the Faculty of History of Moscow State University, Department of Source Studies of Russian History.

Writer 
He started to work on his first novel at the same time as he was working on his final dissertation. His first novel Horovod (Round dance), published in the Novy mir literary magazine in 1996, was one of the six finalists of the Russian Booker Prize in 1997, one of the most important literary awards in Russia. In 1998 Utkin released his second novel, Samoučki (The Autodidacts), also published by Novy Mir. These two novels made his name known. They have been translated into French, German and Chinese. According to Marc Weinstein, a French specialist in Russian literature, the two novels of Anton Outkine "overcome the psychological and social darkness of the last two decades of the twentieth century and introduce us to an expression of literary vitalisme".

Director 
After obtaining a master's degree in history in 1992, three years later Utkin entered the script department of the Higher Courses of Scriptwriters and Directors under the State Television Committee (workshop of Natalya Ryazantseva) where he became interested in documentary films. In 2005, he finished his first documentary Step (The Steppe).

Literary works 
Today Anton Outkine is the author of five novels and five documentary films as well as novelas and short stories.

Novels 
 Horovod (1991—1995) : Moscou, Novyj mir, 1996, No. 9-11 ; Moscou, Grant, 1998  ; Paris, Gallimard, 2001  ; éditions AST-Astrel, Moscou, 2010 ; Pekin, Beijing Daxue Chubanshe, 2016 .
 Samoučki (1997—1998) Moscou, Novyj mir, 1998, No. 12 ; Moscou, Grant, 1999 ; Vienne, Pereprava, 2002  ; Moscou, AST-Astrel, 2010  ; Pekin, Beijing Daxue Chubanshe, 2016, .
 Krepostʹ somneniâ (2000—2006), Moscou, AST-Astrel, 2010 .
 Doroga v snegopad (2008-2010), Moscou, AST-Astrel, 2011 .
 Tridevâtʹ zemelʹ (2012-2016), publié dans la librairie numérique Litres.

Novellas and short stories 
 « Svadʹba za Bugom » , Novyj mir, No.8, 1997
 « Goroduha » , Sovremennye otečestvennye zapiski, No.2, 1999
 « Idi, kuda vlečet tebâ svobodnyj um…» , Znamâ, No.6, 1999
 « Ûžnyj kalendarʹ » , Novyj mir, No. 8, 1999
 « Rasskazy » , Ural, No. 11, 1999
 « Rasskazy » , Oktâbrʹ, No. 1, 2000
 « Približenie k Tendre » , Novyj mir, No. 10, 2003
 « Dym » , Novyj mir No. 12, 2005
 « Veŝij tamburin » , Oktâbrʹ No.4, 2008
 « Nastenʹka » , Novyj mir, No. 11, 2008
 « V kamorke » , Oktâbr’, No.10, 2014
 « Lûdi srednego vozrasta» , Znamâ, N°2, 2018

Other publications 
 Približenie k Tendre : povesti i rasskazy, Toula, Âsnaâ Polâna, 2005 
 Ûžnyj Kalendarʹ : povesti i rasskazy, Moscou, AST-Astrelʹ, 2010 
 Russkaâ proza konca XX veka : hrestomatiâ dlâ studentov, Moscou, Akademiâ, 2002 
 Proza novoj Rossii v četyreh tomah. Tom 4, Moscou, Vagrius, 2003 
 Antologie ruskych povidek, Brno, Literary Guide, 2007

Filmography

Screenplay writer 
 2003 : Poputčiki inžira, Egor Anaškin's short film
 2010 : Ûžnyj kalendar by Denis Karro

Director and screenplay writer 
 2005 : Step
 2008 : Carʹ-svet, Audience Prize ( Rodos Ecofilms 2009, International Films)    
 2011 : Okružaûŝij mir, en collaboration avec Andrej Semaško. Grand Prix of the 4th Pan-Russian Documentary Film Festival Sol' Zemli, 2011
 2012 : Žito, Grand Prix of the 5th Pan-Russian Documentary Film Festival Sol' Zemli, 2012
 2012 : Nepereletnye pticy, in collaboration with Andrej Semaško

Rewards 
 2011 : Grand Prix of the 4th Pan-Russian Documentary Film Festival Sol' Zemli
 1996 and 2003 : Novy Mir Award
 2004 : Yasnaya Poliana Prize 
 1997 : Finalist of the Russian Booker Prize

Notes and references 

1967 births
Living people
20th-century Russian novelists
Russian film directors
Russian screenwriters